"Thriller" is a song by American singer Michael Jackson. It was released by Epic Records in the UK on November 5, 1983, and in the US on January 23, 1984, as the seventh and final single from his sixth studio album, Thriller. "Thriller" is a funk song produced by Quincy Jones and written by Rod Temperton, who wanted to write a theatrical song to suit Jackson's love of film. The music and lyrics evoke horror films, with sound effects such as thunder, creaking doors, footsteps, and wind. It ends with a spoken-word sequence performed by the horror actor Vincent Price.

"Thriller" received positive reviews and became the album's seventh top-ten single on the Billboard Hot 100, reaching number four. It reached number one in Belgium, France and Spain, and the top ten in many other countries. "Thriller" is certified Diamond by the Recording Industry Association of America. In the week of Jackson's death in 2009, it was Jackson's bestselling track in the US, with sales of 167,000 copies on the Billboard Hot Digital Tracks chart. It charted on the Billboard Hot Digital Singles Chart at number two, and remained in the charts' top ten for three consecutive weeks. It appears on several of Jackson's greatest-hits albums and has been covered by numerous artists. 

The "Thriller" music video was directed by John Landis and premiered on MTV on December 2, 1983. In the video, Jackson becomes a zombie and performs a dance routine with a horde of the undead. Many elements of the video have had a lasting impact on popular culture, such as the zombie dance and Jackson's red jacket, and it was the first music video inducted into the National Film Registry. It has been named the greatest music video of all time by various publications and readers' polls.

Composition 

"Thriller" is a disco-funk song. Set in the key of C# minor, it has a moderate tempo of 120 beats per minute. The instrumentation consists of a synthesizer bassline, a Roland Jupiter-8 synthesizer, an electric guitar, a Rhodes piano, a pipe organ, and a horn section consisting of trumpet, trombone, flugelhorn, saxophone, and flute. The introduction features sound effects such as a creaking door, thunder, feet walking on wooden planks, winds and howling wolves. A LinnDrum drum machine was used for this song, which was modified with LM-1 snare & hi-hat sound chips & TR-808 clap chips.

Writing

"Thriller" was written by the English songwriter Rod Temperton, who had previously written "Rock with You" and "Off the Wall" for Jackson's 1979 album Off the Wall. Temperton wanted to write something theatrical to suit Jackson's love of film. He improvised with bass and drum patterns until he developed the bassline that runs through the song, then wrote a chord progression that built to a climax. He recalled: "I wanted it to build and build – a bit like stretching an elastic band throughout the tune to heighten suspense." The backing track, especially the bassline, has certain similarities to the 1981 number-one R&B hit "Give It to Me Baby" by Rick James.

Temperton's first version was titled "Starlight", with the chorus lyric: "Give me some starlight / Starlight sun". The production team, led by Quincy Jones, felt the song should be the title track, but that "Starlight" was not a strong album title. Instead, they wanted something "mysterious to match Michael's evolving persona". Temperton considered several possible titles, including "Midnight Man", which Jones felt was "going in the right direction". Finally, he conceived "Thriller", but worried that it was "a crap word to sing ... It sounded terrible! However, we got Michael to spit it into the microphone a few times and it worked."

With the title settled, Temperton wrote lyrics within "a couple of hours". He envisioned a spoken-word sequence for the end of the song, but did not know what form it should take. It was decided to have a famous voice from the horror genre perform it, and Jones' then-wife, Peggy Lipton, suggested her friend Vincent Price. Temperton composed the words for Price's part in a taxi on the way to the studio on the day of recording.

Recording

Along with the rest of the album, "Thriller" was recorded over eight weeks in 1982. It was recorded at Westlake Recording Studios on Santa Monica Boulevard in Los Angeles, California. The engineer Bruce Swedien had Jackson record his vocals in different approaches, doubling takes and recording at different distances from the microphone. Some background vocals were recorded in the Westlake shower stall. The bassline was performed on an ARP 2600 synthesizer, and the verse pads were performed on a Roland Jupiter-8 and a Yamaha CS-80.

To record the wolf howls, Swedien set up tape recorders up around his Great Dane in a barn overnight, but the dog never howled. Instead, Jackson recorded the howls himself. For the creaking doors, Swedien rented doors designed for sound effects from the Universal Studios Lot and recorded the hinges. Price recorded his part in two takes; Jones, acknowledging that doing a voice-over for a song is difficult, praised Price and described his takes as "fabulous".

Release 
"Thriller" was the final single released from Thriller. It was not initially planned for release, as Jackson's record label, Epic, saw it as a novelty song; the Epic executive Walter Yetnikoff asked: "Who wants a single about monsters?" 

By mid-1983, sales of Thriller had begun to decline. Jackson, who was "obsessive" about his sales figures, urged Yetnikoff and executive Larry Stessel to help conceive a plan to return the album to the top of the charts. Jackson's manager Frank DiLeo suggested releasing "Thriller", backed by a new music video.

Alternative versions of "Thriller", including the original demo version "Starlight", were released on the anniversary Thriller reissues Thriller 25 (2008) and Thriller 40 (2022).

Music video 

The music video for "Thriller" references numerous horror films, and stars Jackson performing a dance routine with a horde of the undead. It was directed by the horror director John Landis and written by Landis and Jackson. Jackson contacted Landis after seeing his film An American Werewolf in London. The pair conceived a 13-minute short film with a budget much larger than previous music videos. Jackson's record company refused to finance it, believing Thriller had peaked, so a making-of documentary, Making Michael Jackson's Thriller, was produced to receive financing from television networks.

Michael Jackson's Thriller premiered on MTV on December 2, 1983. It was launched to great anticipation and played regularly on MTV.  It doubled sales of Thriller, and the documentary sold over a million copies, becoming the bestselling videotape at the time. It is credited for transforming music videos into a serious art form, breaking down racial barriers in popular entertainment, and popularizing the making-of documentary format.

Many elements have had a lasting impact on popular culture, such as the zombie dance and Jackson's red jacket, designed by Landis's wife Deborah Nadoolman. Fans worldwide re-enact its zombie dance and it remains popular on YouTube. The Library of Congress described it as "the most famous music video of all time". In 2009, it became the first music video inducted into the National Film Registry as "culturally, historically or aesthetically" significant.

Chart performance
"Thriller" entered the Billboard Hot 100 charts at number 20. It reached number seven the following week, number five the next, and peaked the next week at number four, where it stayed for two weeks. It finished as the #78 single on Billboard's Hot 100 for the 1984.

"Thriller" charted at number 19 on the Hot R&B/Hip-Hop Songs Chart. On March 10, 1984, it reached its peak at number 3. "Thriller" debuted on the UK Singles Chart on November 19, 1983, at number 24, and the following week peaked at number ten; it appeared on the chart for 52 weeks. Beginning on February 5, 1984, "Thriller" peaked on the French Singles Chart at number one and topped the chart for four consecutive weeks. "Thriller" also topped the Belgian VRT Top 30 Chart for two weeks in January 1984.

Following Jackson's death in 2009, his music surged in popularity. In the week of his death, "Thriller" was Jackson's best-selling track in the US, with sales of 167,000 copies on the Billboard Hot Digital Singles Chart. On July 11, 2009, "Thriller" charted on the Billboard Hot Digital Singles Chart at number two (its peak), and the song remained in the charts' top ten for three consecutive weeks. In the United Kingdom, the song charted at number 23 the week of Jackson's death. The following week, the song reached its peak at number 12 on the UK Single Chart. On July 12, 2009, "Thriller" peaked at number two on the Italian Singles Chart and was later certified gold by the Federation of the Italian Music Industry. "Thriller" reached at number three on the Australian ARIA Chart and Swiss Singles Chart and topped the Spanish Singles Charts for one week. The song also placed within the top ten on the German Singles Chart, Norwegian Singles Chart and Irish Singles Chart, at number nine, number seven and number eight respectively. "Thriller" also landed at number 25 on the Danish Singles Chart. In the third week of July "Thriller" peaked at number 11 in Finland.

The song has returned to the Billboard Hot 100 chart multiple times since its initial release due to its popularity around the time of Halloween. "Thriller" re-entered the Billboard Hot 100 in October 2013 at number 42, number 31 in November 2018, and number 19 in November 2021, marking its highest placement since its original chart run in 1984. This accomplishment means Jackson now has at least one Top 20 hit across 7 consecutive decades from 1969 to 2021 in the Billboard Hot 100.

The song was certified platinum by the Recording Industry Association of America on December 4, 1989, for sales of over one million physical units in the U.S. As of August 2016, the song had sold 4,024,398 copies in the US. By August 2022, it had sold a further 10 million download copies in the US.

Critical reception
Ashley Lasimone, of AOL's Spinner.com, noted that it "became a signature for Jackson" and described "the groove of its bassline, paired with Michael's killer vocals and sleek moves" as having "produced a frighteningly great single." Jon Pareles of The New York Times noted that "'Billie Jean', 'Beat It', 'Wanna Be Startin' Somethin' ' and "the movie in the song 'Thriller'", were the songs, unlike the "fluff" "P.Y.T.", that were "the hits that made Thriller a world-beater; along with Mr. Jackson's stage and video presence, listeners must have identified with his willingness to admit terror." Ann Powers of the Los Angeles Times described "Thriller" as "adequately groovy" with a "funked-out beat" and lyrics "seemingly lifted from some little kid's 'scary storybook'".

Personnel

 Written and composed by Rod Temperton
 Produced by Quincy Jones
 Michael Jackson: lead and background vocals, LinnDrum drum machine
 Featuring: Narration by Vincent Price (Not featured on original edited single version)
 Rod Temperton and Brian Banks: synthesizers
 Greg Phillinganes: synthesizer, Rhodes piano, pipe organ
 Anthony Marinelli: synthesizer programming
 David Williams: guitar

 Jerry Hey, Gary Grant: trumpets, flugelhorns
 Larry Williams: saxophone, flute
 Bill Reichenbach: trombone
 Vocal, rhythm and synthesizer arrangement by Rod Temperton
 Horn arrangement by Jerry Hey
 Effects by Bruce Cannon and Bruce Swedien

Charts

Weekly charts

Year-end charts

Certifications

Film adaptation
In October 2010, it was found that GK Films plans to produce a horror film inspired by the song, directed by Kenny Ortega and produced with Ivan Reitman.

See also
 List of best-selling singles
 List of best-selling singles in the United States
 List of most expensive music videos
 Michael Jackson's Thriller
 Thriller (viral video)
 Thrill the World

References

Bibliography

External links
 

1982 songs
1983 singles
1984 singles
CBS Records singles
Columbia Records singles
Compositions with a narrator
Disco songs
Epic Records singles
Funk songs
Halloween songs
Michael Jackson songs
Number-one singles in Spain
SNEP Top Singles number-one singles
Song recordings produced by Quincy Jones
Songs about monsters
Songs written by Rod Temperton